Kevin Escoffier is a French professional sailor born on 4 April 1980 in Saint-Malo, France and a resident of Lorient. He is an offshore sailor who has won the 2018 Volvo Ocean Race as a bowman onboard DongFeng. and competed in the 2020–2021 Vendée Globe aboard PRB. He is a member of the yacht club SN Baie St. Malo

Biography
He studied Engineering for 3 years at EPF in Paris, 2 years at the École Polytechnique de Montréal and 8 months at the University of Maryland and now specializes in composite engineering. One of his first projects was being involved in the development of Multi 50 class "Crêpes Whaou! 2", which was built for his father Franck-Yves Escoffier, also an offshore sailor. This boat was launched in April 2005 and in November of that year Kevin and his father won class in the Transat Jacques Vabre. We was involved in various IMOCA projects for other skippers, and has headed up Team Banque Populaire’s design office.

2020–2021 Vendee Globe Rescue
While competing in the 2020–2021 Vendée Globe his IMOCA 60 PRB hull broke in half, sinking quickly in the Southern Ocean. Describing the speed of the incident he said “I didn’t have time to do anything, I just had time to send a message to my team. I’m sinking, I’m not joking. MAYDAY.” He later recalled how the boat folded in half.

The race director sent fellow competitor Jean Le Cam to the area who found Kevin in his life raft, but lost contact while preparing to recover Kevin. More competitors were sent to help with the search but Jean Le Cam found Kevin for the second time several hours later and took Kevin onboard.

The rescue got extensive coverage with French President Emmanuel Macron getting in contact with Escoffier and Jean Le Cam. He later described the way the boat folded in 90 degrees and the very limited time he had to abandon the ship, and how him carrying a personal AIS beacon helped save his life.

Results

References

External links

 
 Vendee Campaign Website 
 
 

1980 births
Living people
Sportspeople from Saint-Malo
University of Maryland, Baltimore alumni
French male sailors (sport)
Volvo Ocean Race sailors
Volvo 65 class sailors
IMOCA 60 class sailors
French Vendee Globe sailors
2020 Vendee Globe sailors